Han Wenhai (born 28 January 1971) is a former Chinese football goalkeeper, and the current goalkeeping coach of China League Two club Shenzhen Pengcheng. The Chinese football goalkeeper Han Wenxia is his sister.

Biography
Han Wenhai began his professional football career with Dalian Shide and was one of the first goalkeepers in China to accept the guidance of British coaches to aid players achieve professionalism. This would greatly help him rise to prominence during the 1996 league season when he established himself as Dalian's first-choice goalkeeper and aided the team to win the league title. His performances would see him included in the Chinese squad that took part in the 1996 AFC Asian Cup where he played understudy to Ou Chuliang. This was then followed by several FIFA World Cup qualifying games, however he struggled to replace Ou as the team's goalkeeper and despite being called up to several squads he found another goalkeeper Jiang Jin pushing ahead of him for the goalkeeper position. At Dalian he remained the team's number one goalkeeper for the next several years and won three more league titles until he left at the end of the 2000 league season when he was replaced by Chen Dong.

Han Wenhai would join second tier side Zhejiang Lücheng in 2001 and would go on to play eighteen league games, however he only stayed for one season before joining top tier Shenyang Ginde at the beginning of the 2002 league season. Han stayed with Shenyang for three seasons before retiring at the end of the 2004 league season.

Honours

Club
Dalian Shide
Chinese Jia-A League: 1996, 1997, 1998, 2000

Individual
China Team of the year: 1996, 1997

Personal life
His sister Han Wenxia was a goalkeeper for China women's national football team.

References

External links
Player profile at Sina.com

1971 births
Living people
Chinese footballers
Footballers from Dalian
China international footballers
1996 AFC Asian Cup players
Dalian Shide F.C. players
Zhejiang Professional F.C. players
Changsha Ginde players
Association football goalkeepers